A partial solar eclipse will occur on Friday, September 23, 2033. A solar eclipse occurs when the Moon passes between Earth and the Sun, thereby totally or partly obscuring the image of the Sun for a viewer on Earth. A partial solar eclipse occurs in the polar regions of the Earth when the center of the Moon's shadow misses the Earth.

Images 
Animated path

Related eclipses

Solar eclipses of 2033–2036

Metonic series 
 All eclipses in this table occur at the Moon's ascending node.

References

External links 
 http://eclipse.gsfc.nasa.gov/SEplot/SEplot2001/SE2033Sep23P.GIF

2033 in science
2033 9 23
2033 9 23